Michael Steiner (born 10 August 1974) is a retired Austrian football player and a football manager who currently manages SK Rapid Wien II.

Playing career

Steiner played as a midfielder until retiring in 1999.

Coaching career

Steiner currently manages SK Rapid Wien II in the Austrian Regional League East.

Coaching record

References

External links
 

1974 births
Living people
Austrian footballers
Austrian football managers
SKN St. Pölten managers
Association football midfielders